The 1920 Nova Scotia general election was held on 27 July 1920 to elect members of the 37th House of Assembly of the Province of Nova Scotia, Canada. It was won by the Liberal party.

This was the first general election in which women could vote and run for office.

Results

Results by party

Retiring incumbents
Liberal
James F. Ellis, Guysborough
George Everett Faulkner, Halifax
Robert Hugh MacKay, Pictou
Fred Robert Trotter, Antigonish

Liberal-Conservative
Neil Ferguson, Cape Breton
James W. Kirkpatrick, Cumberland
Hector MacInnes, Halifax
Frank Stanfield, Colchester

Nominated candidates
Legend
bold denotes party leader
† denotes an incumbent who is not running for re-election or was defeated in nomination contest

Valley

|-
|rowspan=2 bgcolor=whitesmoke|Annapolis
||
|Frank R. Elliott3,33027.90%
|
|
|
|Vernon B. Leonard2,51221.05%
|
|
||
|Frank R. Elliott
|-
||
|Orlando Daniels3,63030.41%
|
|
|
|Edgar C. Shaffner2,46320.64%
|
|
||
|Orlando Daniels
|-
|rowspan=2 bgcolor=whitesmoke|Digby
||
|Henry W.B. Warner2,99730.93%
|
|
|
|Glidden Campbell1,83518.94%
|
|
||
|Henry W.B. Warner
|-
||
|Joseph William Comeau3,16532.67%
|
|
|
|Emede Robicheau 1,69217.46%
|
|
||
|Joseph William Comeau
|-
|rowspan=2 bgcolor=whitesmoke|Hants
|
|
|
|Albert Parsons2,08321.06%
||
|John Alexander MacDonald2,17922.03%
|
|Wiley V. Davison99810.09%
||
|Albert Parsons
|-
||
|James William Reid3,03530.69%
|
|
|
|Walter J. Aylword1,59416.12%
|
|
||
|James William Reid
|-
|rowspan=2 bgcolor=whitesmoke|Kings
||
|John Alexander McDonald4,70528.21%
|
|James E. Kinsman3,62221.71%
|
|
|
|
||
|James E. Kinsman
|-
||
|Harry H. Wickwire4,91729.48%
|
|C.R. Bill3,43720.60%
|
|
|
|
||
|Harry H. Wickwire
|}

South Shore

|-
|rowspan=2 bgcolor=whitesmoke|Lunenburg
||
|John James Kinley4,90030.24%
|
|Lemeau J. Hebb3,23719.98%
|
|
|
|
||
|John James Kinley
|-
||
|Aubrey Sperry4,79529.60%
|
|Foster W. Verge3,27020.18%
|
|
|
|
||
|Vacant
|-
|rowspan=2 bgcolor=whitesmoke|Queens
||
|George S. McClearn1,60726.15%
|
|William Lorimer Hall1,48524.17%
|
|
|
|
||
|William Lorimer Hall
|-
||
|Jordan W. Smith1,73728.27%
|
|Robert Smith1,31621.42%
|
|
|
|
||
|Jordan W. Smith
|-
|rowspan=2 bgcolor=whitesmoke|Shelburne
||
|Robert Irwin1,91728.64%
|
|William T. Brannen1,62324.25%
|
|
|
|
||
|Robert Irwin
|-
||
|Frank E. Smith1,77426.51%
|
|Wendell H. Currie1,37920.60%
|
|
|
|
||
|Frank E. Smith
|-
|rowspan=2 bgcolor=whitesmoke|Yarmouth 
|
|Ernest Howard Armstrong3,05231.55%
||
|Howard Corning3,41635.31%
|
|
|
|
||
|Ernest Howard Armstrong
|-
||
|Amédée Melanson3,20733.15%
|
|
|
|
|
|
||
|Vacant
|}

Fundy-Northeast

|-
|rowspan=2 bgcolor=whitesmoke|Colchester
|
|
|
|Robert H. Kennedy3,09623.33%
||
|Harry L. Taggart3,43025.84%
|
|
||
|Robert H. Kennedy
|-
|
|
|
|William R. Dunbar3,21324.21%
||
|Robert Hunter Smith3,53326.62%
|
|
||
|Frank Stanfield†
|-
|rowspan=3 bgcolor=whitesmoke|Cumberland
|
|James Ralston4,48614.55%
|
|Grace McLeod Rogers 2,4708.01%
|
|
||
|Archibald Terris4,71615.30%
||
|James Ralston
|-
|
|Varley B. Fullerton2,6598.63%
|
|Percy L. Spicer1,8646.05%
||
|Gilbert Nelson Allen4,93416.01%
|
|
||
|James W. Kirkpatrick†
|-
|
|Rufus Carter3,21510.43%
|
|Everett C. Leslie1,7145.56%
||
|Daniel George McKenzie4,76615.46%
|
|
||
|Rufus Carter
|}

Halifax

|-
|rowspan=5 bgcolor=whitesmoke|Halifax
||
|Adam Dunlap Burris5,9369.07%
|
|John B. Archibald4,0456.18%
|
|Joseph S. Wallace3,4095.21%
|
|Ronald A. McDonald3,3695.15%
||
|Hector MacInnes†
|-
||
|John L. Connolly5,8178.89%
|
|Robert A. Brenton3,8605.90%
|
|Peter McN. Kuhn3,1654.83%
|
|Patrick J. Healy3,3365.10%
||
|John L. Connolly
|-
||
|John Brown Douglas6,0579.25%
|
|Frederick W. Stevens3,6425.56%
|
|
|
|Joseph H. McKenzie3,1574.82%
||
|George Everett Faulkner†
|-
||
|Henry Bauld6,55410.01%
|
|Francis A. Gillis3,5955.49%
|
|
|
|
||
|Henry Bauld
|-
||
|Robert Emmett Finn6,2859.60%
|
|Edward L. Power3,2364.94%
|
|
|
|
||
|Robert Emmett Finn
|}

Central Nova

|-
|rowspan=2 bgcolor=whitesmoke|Antigonish 
|
|Alexander Stirling MacMillan1,72523.65%
|
|
||
|Angus J. MacGillivray1,80424.73%
|
|
||
|Fred Robert Trotter†
|-
||
|William Chisholm2,05928.23%
|
|
|
|Fred R. Irish1,70623.39%
|
|
||
|William Chisholm
|-
|rowspan=2 bgcolor=whitesmoke|Guysborough
||
|Clarence W. Anderson2,35930.36%
|
|
|
|D.P. Floyd1,48319.09%
|
|
||
|James F. Ellis†
|-
||
|James Cranswick Tory2,61933.71%
|
|
|
|J.A. Dillon1,30916.85%
|
|
||
|James Cranswick Tory
|-
|rowspan=3 bgcolor=whitesmoke|Pictou
||
|Robert M. McGregor6,05615.78%
|
|John Bell4,41611.51%
|
|Alexander D. MacKay5,98415.59%
|
|Henry D. Fraser6,01215.66%
||
|Robert M. McGregor
|-
||
|John Welsford MacDonald6,28716.38%
|
|
|
|
|
|Bertha A. Donaldson2,9307.63%
||
|Robert Hugh MacKay†
|-
||
|Robert Henry Graham6,69617.45%
|
|
|
|
|
|
||
|Robert Henry Graham
|}

Cape Breton

|-
|rowspan=4 bgcolor=whitesmoke|Cape Breton
|
|W.F. Carroll6,4719.08%
|
|Neil R. McArthur2,8093.94%
|
|
||
|Joseph Steele9,80013.75%
||
|Neil Ferguson†
|-
|
|A.B. MacGillivray5,3347.49%
|
|A.C. MacCormick2,7493.86%
|
|
||
|Arthur R. Richardson9,17712.88%
||
|Vacant
|-
|
|Daniel Alexander Cameron5,7298.04%
|
|Ewen MacKay Forbes2,3433.29%
|
|
||
|Forman Waye9,40713.20%
||
|Daniel Alexander Cameron
|-
|
|N. MacDonald5,2707.40%
|
|Charles B. Smith2,3383.28%
|
|
||
|D. W. Morrison9,83013.80%
||
|Vacant
|-
|rowspan=2 bgcolor=whitesmoke|Inverness
||
|Donald MacLennan3,46126.32%
|
|Moses Elijah McGarry2,64320.10%
|
|
|
|John J. McNeil1,76313.40%
||
|Donald MacLennan
|-
||
|John C. Bourinot3,20424.36%
|
|Malcolm McKay2,08115.82%
|
|
|
|
||
|John C. Bourinot
|-
|rowspan=2 bgcolor=whitesmoke|Richmond
|
|G.H. Murray1,76124.35%
||
|Benjamin Amedeé LeBlanc1,82325.20%
|
|
|
|
||
|Benjamin Amedeé LeBlanc
|-
|
|George R. Deveau1,72823.89%
||
|John Alexander MacDonald1,92126.56%
|
|
|
|
||
|John Alexander MacDonald
|-
|rowspan=2 bgcolor=whitesmoke|Victoria
||
|George Henry Murray2,07832.42%
|
|Guy McL. Matheson1,10917.30%
|
|
|
|
||
|George Henry Murray
|-
||
|Angus Gladstone Buchanan2,01331.41%
|
|Phillip McLeod1,20918.86%
|
|
|
|
||
|Vacant
|}

References

Notes

Further reading
 

1920
1920 elections in Canada
1920 in Nova Scotia
July 1920 events